Leptospermum laevigatum, commonly known as the coast tea tree, is a species of shrub or small tree that is endemic to south-eastern Australia, but has been widely introduced in other places where it is often considered to be a weed. It has thin, rough bark on the older stems, narrow egg-shaped leaves, relatively large white flowers and flat topped fruit that is shed shortly after reaching maturity.

Description
The young stems are covered with silky hairs at first and have a groove near the base of the petiole. There are many reddish brown bracts around the flower buds but most fall off as the flower opens. The fruit mostly fall from the plant shortly after reaching maturity.

Taxonomy and naming
This teatree was first formally described in 1788 by Joseph Gaertner who gave it the name Fabricia laevigata and published the description in his book De Fructibus et Seminibus Plantarum. In 1858, Ferdinand von Mueller changed the name to Leptospermum laevigatum. The specific epithet (laevigatum) is from a Latin word meaning "made smooth" or "having a polished surface".

Distribution and habitat
Leptospermum laevigatum is native to New South Wales, Victoria and Tasmania where it grows in heath, sometimes forest and on coastal dunes and cliffs south from Nambucca Heads in New South Wales to Anglesea in Victoria and northern Tasmania. It has also been introduced to Queensland, South Australia, Western Australia and countries overseas including southern Africa, New Zealand, Hawaii and the Central Coast of California.

Ecology
Coast teatree is salt-resistant, very hardy and is commonly used in amenities plantings and coastal plantings. It has also been planted in Western Australia where it has become a weed.
This species has been planted along the Central Coast of California in the United States to stabilize sand. It is known there as the Australian tea tree.  The seeds can be dispersed by wind and water.

It has now become naturalised in New Zealand, southern Africa, California and Hawaii.

The larvae of Holocola thalassinana feed on Leptospermum laevigatum.

Cultivation
L. laevigatum is planted widely as a garden ornamental or display tree. It is useful as a windbreak or hedging plant and for the rapid stabilisation of sandy soils, and in rehabilitation areas where construction or mining has taken place.

Conservation status
L. laevigatum is not listed on the advisory list of rare or threatened plants in Victoria (2014).

Gallery

References

External links
Photo gallery

laevigatum
Flora of New South Wales
Flora of South Australia
Flora of Tasmania
Flora of Victoria (Australia)
Myrtales of Australia
Halophytes
Plants described in 1788
Taxa named by Joseph Gaertner